IC3PEAK is a Russian electronic music band created by Anastasia Kreslina and Nikolay Kostilev. They achieved worldwide notice because of the political undertones in their music criticizing the Russian government, which led to attempts of censorship of their music in 2019. Their effects in mainstream media led to outpouring support throughout the West, and in Russia.

History

Origins

According to the duo, October 19, 2013 is considered to be the foundation date of IC3PEAK.

From the very beginning of the project the distinctive features of IC3PEAK's work were a mixture of musical genres, a simultaneous emphasis on both audio and visual components, and lyrics that dealt with taboo topics such as death. Both artists characterize the initial period of their work as “audiovisual terrorism”. In 2014, they released the EP Substances, their first project. The entire EP was written in English. The visual design was done by Anastasia and Nikolai themselves.
Shortly after, the video for the song "Ether" was presented to the public, being the first video work of IC3PEAK.

Gaining popularity abroad

From the first days of its existence the project gained popularity outside of Russia. In 2014, after the release of their second EP Vacuum, IC3PEAK performed at their first overseas concerts in European cities such as Bordeaux, Paris, Riga, Prague, and Helsinki. Two years later, in 2016, the project performed in South America. During their stay in Brazil, the duo partially filmed their music video for the song "Go With The Flow". To this day, the IC3PEAK project continues to successfully tour abroad.

Music in the Russian language

On November third, 2017, IC3PEAK released their first album in Russian — Sladkaya zhizn (“Sweet life”) and the music video for the song “Grustnaya suka” ("Sad Bitch") which quickly became a hit.  The video currently has over 57 million views on YouTube.

In the duo's earlier work their vocals performed the role of an ”instrument”. However, in Russian-language texts the semantic component prevails and references to Russian folk art are emphasized. Flowing with their increased popularity in their homeland, the duo released another Russian-language longplay named "Skazka” (“Fairy Tale") on September 28, 2018. It included new videos made for the compositions "Skazka” and ”Smerti bolshe net” ("Death No More"). The video for the song "Smerti bolshe net" is IC3PEAK's most viewed music video - at this time it has more than 100 million views on YouTube. 
The band's third album in Russian called Do Svidaniya ("Goodbye") was released on April 24, 2020.

2018 tour and repression attempts by authorities 

The second Russian-language album by IC3PEAK named Sladkaya zhizn and, in particular, the video for the song “Smerti bolshe net” had wide political resonance. Some conservative public figures protested the video as an insult to law enforcement structures and to the Russian authorities. They also claimed the video contained calls to suicide, which, according to the authorities, could have an impact on the duo's underage fans.
The Russian security forces began to target IC3PEAK's next planned tour. According to IC3PEAK, people calling themselves representatives of the security forces made threatening calls to concert venues throughout Russia, forcing them to refuse to host the duo's concerts. The performance in Novosibirsk on 1 December 2018 became the peak of that confrontation. On that day, the participants of the IC3PEAK project and the local concert organizers were detained while exiting the train at Novosibirsk Central Railway Station. After a series of threats, interrogations and 3 hours of detention, the police, under public pressure (which included Western media), were forced to release the artists without drawing up protocols. The concert took place at an alternative venue. After a series of canceled concerts, a number of musicians and public figures around the world expressed their active support for IC3PEAK and their opposition to art censorship in Russia.

Members 

 Anastasia Kreslina - author of all lyrics and vocal parts, designs covers and other visual components.
 Nikolay Kostilev - author of all instrumentals.

Discography

Albums 
 IC3PEAK (2015)
 より多くの愛 (2015)
 Fallal (2016)
 Сладкая жизнь (Sladkaya zhizn) (2017)
 Сказка (Skazka) (2018)
 До свидания (Do svidaniya) (2020)
 Kiss of Death (2022)

EP 
 Substances (2014) 
 Vacuum (2014)

Singles 
 "Ellipse" (2014) / Electronica Records
 "I’ll Be Found" (remixes) (2014)
 "Really Really" (2014)
 "Kawaii" / "Warrior" (2016) / Manimal Vinyl
 "Kto" (2017) / Self-released
 "Monster" (2017) / Manimal Vinyl
 "This World is Sick" (2018)
 "Fairytale / Skazka" (2018)
 "Death No More / Smerti bolshe nyet" (2018)
 "Boo-Hoo / Plak-plak" (2020)
 "Trrst" (featuring ZillaKami) (2020)
"Vampir" (featuring Oliver Sykes of Bring Me the Horizon) (2021) 
"Cherv / Worm" (with Kim Dracula) (2022)
"Dead but Pretty" (2022)
"Kiss of Death" (2022)

Visuals 
Throughout its existence, the members of the IC3PEAK project have been producing visual design and video content by themselves.
Anastasia and Nikolay write scripts, direct, edit and process their videos, take photographs and create cover art for releases by themselves.

Videos

Awards and nominations 

 	Jager Music Awards Winners, Electronics (2017)
	Winners of the Golden Gargoyle Award for Best Experimental Project of the Year (2017)
   Anastasia Kreslina and Nikolay Kostilev became nominees for the "30 under 30" award held by Forbes magazine

Personal life 
Anastasia and Nikolai keep an extremely private lifestyle and rarely appear in public. It is not known for certain who they are to each other - in interviews, the musicians avoid giving a direct answer to this question. They also mention that they live in a wooden hut, away from city life, and this helps them to fully concentrate on their creative work process.

References

External links 
 IC3PEAK YouTube Channel

Russian electronic music groups
Musical groups established in 2013
Russian experimental musical groups
Musical groups from Moscow
Russian hip hop
Rappers from Moscow
Russian hip hop groups
Russian hip hop musicians
2013 establishments in Russia